Howell Colston Featherston (April 27, 1871 – January 5, 1958) was an American Democratic politician who served as a member of the Virginia Senate, representing the state's 20th district.

References

External links
 

1871 births
1958 deaths
Democratic Party Virginia state senators
20th-century American politicians
People from Campbell County, Virginia